My Thanks to You is a studio album recorded by American entertainer Connie Francis. The album features songs which had been popular on both sides of the Atlantic between the 1920s and the 1940s. It was recorded March 4–6, 1959, at EMI's famous Abbey Road Studios in London.

Background
During the sessions, Francis recorded two versions of the song I'll Close My Eyes, written by Billy Reid and Buddy Kaye. Both recordings share the same orchestral arrangement but different sets of lyrics, which are referred to as "American version" and "British version" for distinction. The British version was included on the album, while the American version remained unreleased until 1993.

Geoff Love and Tony Osborne, who both also appeared as conductors, provided arrangements in the style of British Light Music to make the album more appealing especially to British audiences, who had rewarded Francis with two No. 1 chart hits. Who's Sorry Now? and Stupid Cupid had reached the top in 1958, making her even more successful on the European side of the Atlantic than in her native America, where both songs had peaked at No. 4 and No. 16 respectively.

However, even with sophisticated singles such as My Happiness (a US No. 2  and a UK No. 4 for her in early 1959), Francis was still considered too much of a rock 'n' roll singer to be also accepted as a performer of adult contemporary material; hence, the albums failed to make an impression on the charts.

The album was re-packaged with a new cover design and re-released in March 1962.

Track listing

Side A

Side B

Unreleased songs from the sessions

References

Connie Francis albums
1959 albums
MGM Records albums
Albums conducted by Geoff Love
Albums arranged by Geoff Love
Albums produced by Norman Newell